Eugène Marc Antoine Besse (17 November 1881 in Paris – 20 February 1919 in Paris) was a French track and field athlete who competed at the 1900 Summer Olympics in Paris, France. Besse competed in the marathon. He placed fourth with a time of 4:00:43 over the 40.26 kilometre course.

References

External links

 De Wael, Herman. Herman's Full Olympians: "Athletics 1900". Accessed 18 March 2006.
 

1881 births
1919 deaths
Athletes (track and field) at the 1900 Summer Olympics
Olympic athletes of France
French male long-distance runners
French male marathon runners
Athletes from Paris